Banda Prakash Mudiraj (born 1954) is an Indian politician who is currently Deputy Chairman of the Telangana Legislative Council from 12 February 2023. Also He is the Member of Telangana Legislative Council from 22 November 2021. Earlier he served as Member of Parliament in Rajya Sabha representing Telangana from 23rd March 2018 to 4th December 2021. He won the voting with 33 votes. He is the President of Telangana Mudiraj Mahasabha. He belongs to TRS Party in Telangana. 

Banda Prakash was unanimously elected as Deputy Chairman of the Telangana Legislative Council on 12 February 2023.

Life
Banda Prakash was born to Banda Satyanarayana in Warangal district in Telangana. He did his Ph.D. from Kakatiya University in 1996.

References 

Telangana Rashtra Samithi politicians
Telangana politicians
Rajya Sabha members from Telangana
Living people
1954 births